Castlewood High School is a high school located in Castlewood, Virginia.  The school offers Advanced Placement, Dual Enrollment, and Career/Technical courses in addition to other academic courses.  The school also offers classes with Virtual Virginia Schools. Castlewood High School was integrated in 1965 with students from Arty Lee High School in Dante, Virginia.

Athletics

Baseball
Castlewood High School has won two VHSL state championships in baseball in 1971 and 1986 with second-place finishes in 1972, 1973, and 1974.

Softball
Castlewood won a state championship in softball in 1987 and finished second in 1995.

Other sports
Castlewood finished second in the state championships in boys' golf in 2007.  The boys' golf team took second place in state championships in 1971, 1987, and 1988.  The girls' volleyball team won the state championship in 1987.  The wrestling team won state championship in 1989, placed second in 1986 and fourth in 2009.

References

Public high schools in Virginia
Schools in Russell County, Virginia